Mostly Ghostly: Have You Met My Ghoulfriend? is a 2014 American horror comedy fantasy film directed by Peter Hewitt. The film is a sequel to the 2008 film Mostly Ghostly: Who Let the Ghosts Out?. The film is based on the second book of the same name by R. L. Stine and the second installment in the Mostly Ghostly film series. The film was released on DVD on September 2, 2014, and was broadcast on Disney Channel on October 11, 2014.

Plot
Max Doyle (Ryan Ochoa) has eyes only for Cammie Cahill (Bella Thorne); the smart, popular red head girl in school. When Max finally scores a date with Cammie on Halloween, Phears, an evil ghost with plans taking over the world, unleashes his ghouls and things go haywire. With the help of his friends - Tara (Madison Pettis) and Nicky (Roshon Fegan) - who have turned into ghosts, he tries to destroy Phears (Charlie Hewson), before he takes over the world. The next morning, Max tells the truth to Cammie about having two ghost-friends.  Cammie believes him and they make out, revealing that they are now dating.

Cast
 Bella Thorne as Cammie Cahill
 Ryan Ochoa as Max Doyle
 Roshon Fegan as Nicky Roland
 Madison Pettis as Tara Roland
 Charlie Hewson as Phears
 Calum Worthy as Colin Doyle
 Eric Allan Kramer as John Doyle
 Gigi Rice as Harriet Doyle
 Joan Rivers as Grandma Doyle
 Caroline Lagerfelt as Emma
 Anastasia Baranova as Young Emma
 Chelsea Vale as Chelsea
 Isabella Revel as the Clown Girl
 Wyatt Bernard as Bernie
 Abbey Blake as Trick or Treater

Reception
Common Sense Media criticized the film as being "way too silly to be scary, so it never delivers on its essential promise." DVD Verdict also gave a negative review and questioned its pacing, stating that "After the climax, in which our heroes confront ultimate evil, the movie goes on and on, with a lengthy soccer game and a big dance sequence like the one from Slumdog Millionaire. The whole time, I was wondering, "Why isn't the movie over already?""

Felix Vasquez Jr. was slightly more positive, writing that it was "Overly padded, but makes for a decent fantasy horror adventure."

Sequel
The film was followed by a sequel, Mostly Ghostly: One Night in Doom House, with an entirely new cast, which was released on DVD and Digital HD on September 6, 2016.

References

External links

2010s comedy horror films
2014 films
American comedy horror films
American children's films
2010s English-language films
American films about Halloween
Films about orphans
Films based on children's books
American ghost films
Films based on works by R. L. Stine
Direct-to-video sequel films
Universal Pictures direct-to-video films
Films directed by Peter Hewitt
2014 comedy films
2010s American films